Laura van der Heijden may refer to:

 Laura van der Heijden (musician), British cellist
 Laura van der Heijden (handballer), Dutch handball player